is a village in Yamagata Prefecture, Japan. As of January 2020, the village has an estimated population of 3044, and a population density of 14 persons per km2.

Geography
Ōkura is located in a mountainous north-central eastern Yamagata Prefecture, and includes Mount Gassan within its borders. The Mogami River runs through the village. The area is known for extremely heavy snows in winter. Its highest accumulation of snow recorded is 414 cm, second place in Japan after Sukayu Onsen in Aomori. Snow typically starts in November, and starts piling up on the ground by early December. The snow will usually stop by early May, but will not completely melt until mid-June. Similar to Sukayu Onsen, snowfalls of 50 to 100 cm in a single day are not uncommon at all.

Neighboring municipalities
Yamagata Prefecture
Shinjō
Murayama
Sagae
Funagata
Tozawa
Shōnai
Nishikawa

Climate
Ōkura has a Humid continental climate (Köppen climate classification Cfa) with large seasonal temperature differences, with warm to hot (and often humid) summers and cold (sometimes severely cold) winters. Precipitation is significant throughout the year, but is heaviest from August to October.

Demographics
Per Japanese census data, the population of Ōkura peaked around 1950 and is now considerably less than it was a century ago.

History
The area of present-day Ōkura was part of ancient Dewa Province. During the Sengoku period, the area was under the control of the Mogami clan. During the Edo period, the village was a river port on the Mogami River and a post station on the pilgrimage route to Mount Gassan.  After the start of the Meiji period, the area became part of Mogami District, Yamagata Prefecture. The village of Ōkura was established on April 1, 1889 with the establishment of the modern municipalities system.

Economy
The main industry is agriculture (tomato and buckwheat), sake production, and seasonal tourism to its hot spring resorts. Kokeshi dolls are a noted local handicraft.

Education
Ōkura has one public elementary school and one public middle school operated by the village government. The village does not have a high school.

Transportation

Railways
Ōkura does not have any passenger railway service.

Highways

Local attractions
ruins of Shimizu Castle
Hijiori hot springs

References

External links

Official Website  

 
Villages in Yamagata Prefecture